Oypa (Oyak Pazarlamacılık Hizmetleri A.Ş., OYPA Oyak Büyük Mağazacılık Ticaret A.Ş.) is a chain of supermarkets in Turkey. The company for food and non-food item retailing is owned by  Koç Holding, which also owned the Migros Türk chain before selling it to Moonlight Capital.
It was formerly owned by the Ordu Yardımlaşma Kurumu (Oyak), the Armed Forces Pension Fund.

References

 
  
 Oypa yenileniyor 
 Oypa faaliyetlerini durdurdu 

Retail companies established in 1963
Supermarkets of Turkey